Epidendrum purpurascens (syn. Coilostylis clavata) is a species of orchid in the genus Epidendrum.

References

purpurascens